Jörg Vogel (born 1 April 1967 in Cottbus, Germany) is a German scientist in the field of RNA biology and microbiology. He holds a position as full professor, chairs the Institute for Molecular Infection Biology (IMIB) at the University of Würzburg, Germany, and is a founding Helmholtz-Institute director. Vogel studied biochemistry at the Humboldt University of Berlin and the Imperial College London. After his PhD  work (1996–1999) he performed postdoctoral research at the Uppsala University, Sweden and was an EMBO fellow at the Hebrew University Jerusalem, Israel. From 2004 to 2009 he was a group leader at the Max Planck Institute for Infection Biology. Since 2009 he is a full professor at the IMIB and head of the institute as successor to Jörg Hacker. Furthermore, he is founding director of the Helmholtz-Institute for RNA-based Infection Research (HIRI) in Würzburg that was established in 2017.

Vogel's current activities cover the fields of small regulatory RNAs in bacteria, RNA sequencing, RNA localization as well as microRNAs and long non-coding RNAs in infected eukaryotic hosts. Jörg Vogel has contributed to over 200 research publications including many articles in high impact journals like Nature, Cell and Science. Among other achievements he pioneered the application of RNA-Seq for the analysis of the bacterial transcription, CRISPR RNA maturation and host-pathogen interactions.

 

Jörg Vogel received the VAAM Research award (2010) and the DGHM Senior Scientist Award (2011). In 2011 he was honored for his outstanding research and became an EMBO member. In 2013 Vogel was elected to the American Academy of Microbiology  and the German Academy of Sciences Leopoldina. Thomson Reuters included Jörg Vogel in the list of 2015 Highly Cited Researchers. Starting from January 2016 to January 2019 he is a visiting professor at the Imperial College London in the Division of Infectious Diseases. Furthermore, Vogel was one of the Gottfried Wilhelm Leibniz Prize winners 2017.

He has been announced as president of the European Academy of Microbiology (EAM) from 1 January 2021.

References

External links
 Website of the IMIB
 List of Jörg Vogel's publications
 Video of an interview with Jörg Vogel and the Senior Editor of the EMBO Journal, Karin Dumstrei – part 1, part 2

Members of the European Molecular Biology Organization
Living people
21st-century German biologists
1967 births
People from Cottbus
Humboldt University of Berlin alumni
Alumni of Imperial College London
Gottfried Wilhelm Leibniz Prize winners